Perkins is an unincorporated community and census-designated place in western Scott County, Missouri, United States. It is located sixteen miles northwest of Sikeston.

A post office called Perkins has been in operation since 1890. The community has the name of Amos Perkins, a businessperson in the local lumber industry.

Perkins is found in the St. Louis Southwestern Railway Northern Division Employee Time Table No. 10 dated August 18, 1935. Perkins was station I-24 at milepost 23.76. It had a 20 car siding. In 1935 terms that was 900 feet long, as the then standard car was 45 feet in length. There was a mail crane at Perkins. It was a flagstop for passenger trains #5 and #6. Nearby Randles had a day/night telegraph and long lap sidings to meet trains.

Demographics

References
St. Louis Southwestern Railway Northern Division Employee Time Table No. 10 dated August 18, 1935

Unincorporated communities in Scott County, Missouri
Unincorporated communities in Missouri